Royal Air Force Turnhouse or more simply RAF Turnhouse is a former Royal Air Force Sector Station located in Edinburgh, Scotland. It is now Edinburgh Airport.

History

The following units were here at some point:
First World War
 No. 26 Reserve Squadron
 No. 26 Training Squadron
 No. 73 Training Squadron
 No. 84 (Canadian) Reserve Squadron
 No. 89 (Canadian) Reserve Squadron
Squadrons

Units

Current use

The site is now Edinburgh Airport.

References

Citations

Bibliography

 
Royal Air Force stations in Scotland
Royal Air Force stations of World War II in the United Kingdom